Aleksandr Petrov (born 9 August 1986 in Bryansk) is a Russian long jumper. He competed in the long jump event at the 2012 Summer Olympics.

Competition record

References

1986 births
Living people
Sportspeople from Bryansk
Russian male long jumpers
Olympic male long jumpers
Olympic athletes of Russia
Athletes (track and field) at the 2012 Summer Olympics
Russian Athletics Championships winners